Mantidactylus guttulatus is a species of frog in the family Mantellidae. It is endemic to Madagascar.

Its natural habitats are subtropical or tropical moist lowland forests and rivers. It is not considered threatened by the IUCN.

References

 

guttulatus
Endemic frogs of Madagascar
Taxonomy articles created by Polbot
Amphibians described in 1881